The following television stations in the United States brand as channel 6 (though neither using virtual channel 6 nor broadcasting on physical RF channel 6):
 KECY-DT3 in El Centro, California
 KEQI-LD in Dededo, Guam
 KONG in Everett, Washington
 WGEM-DT2 in Quincy, Illinois
 WGGB-DT2 in Springfield, Massachusetts
 WRUF-LD in Gainesville, Florida
 WSTM-DT2 in Syracuse, New York

The following television stations in the United States formerly branded as channel 6:
 KASW in Phoenix, Arizona
 KMIR-TV in Palm Springs, California
 WCNC-TV in Charlotte, North Carolina

06 branded